Instrumental Collection: The Shrapnel Years is a compilation album by guitarist/vocalist Richie Kotzen, including instrumental songs from several albums through his career.

Track listing
All songs written by Richie Kotzen

Personnel
Richie Kotzen – electric guitar, wurlitzer piano, bass guitar, keyboards
Steve Smith – drums (on "Squeeze Play", "Strut It", "Unsafe At Any Speed", "Cryptic Script")
Stuart Hamm – bass (on "Squeeze Play", "Strut It", "Unsafe At Any Speed", "Cryptic Script")
Danny Thompson – bass (on "B Funk", "Acid Lips", "Hot Rails", "Slow Blues")
Atma Anur – drums (on "B Funk", "Acid Lips", "Hot Rails", "Slow Blues")
Jeff Berlin – bass (on "Pulse" & "Dose")
Gregg Bissonette – drums (on "Pulse" & "Dose")

References

Richie Kotzen albums
2006 compilation albums
Albums produced by Mike Varney
Shrapnel Records albums